Vittorio Algeri (born 3 January 1953) is a directeur sportif, most recently for Team Milram. A former cyclist, he finished in 8th place in the men's road race for Italy at the 1976 Summer Olympics. He was born in Torre de' Roveri, Bergamo, Italy.

References

External links

1953 births
Living people
Directeur sportifs
Italian male cyclists
Cyclists at the 1976 Summer Olympics
Olympic cyclists of Italy
Cyclists from the Province of Bergamo
20th-century Italian people